"Born-N-Raised"  is the third single from DJ Khaled's debut album, Listennn... the Album, produced by The Runners. The single features Pitbull, Trick Daddy and Rick Ross. It was released on June 6, 2006. The song is also included on Pitbull's second studio album El Mariel.

Reception
HipHopDX said, when reviewing for Listennn...the Album: "Musically, Khaled and the crew keep it dirty with "Born-N-Raised," which is an infectious anthem.". According to PopMatters: Listennn "opens with the song, in which the local heavyweights Trick Daddy, Pitbull and Rick Ross reestablish their status as the leaders of the pack. The beat barely contains Trick's greasy flow as he proclaims once again, against his own wailing overdubs, that he is a thug. Pitbull bilingually shouts out Trick and Luke (of 2 Live Crew). Rick Ross shines the most, closing the track with carefully enunciated statements proclaiming his greatness and name-checking neighborhoods." RapReviews commented on the song: "The Runners' opening organs and funk of "Born-N-Raised" are laced up." XXL said about "Born-N-Raised": "Inspired collaborations like the Miami anthem featuring Trick Daddy, Rick Ross and Pitbull save it's album from further mediocrity." Stylus Magazine: "Khaled constantly represents Miami and Dade County throughout Listennn, not the least on the all-star anthem "Born N Raised" featuring Trick Daddy, Pitbull, and Rick Ross."

Music video
This video was directed by Gil Green at a total length of 4:19, and features cameos from actor Steven Bauer, baseball legend Jose Canseco and Miami Heat forward, Udonis Haslem.

Charts

Track listing
"Born-N-Raised"  – 4:19
Source:

Release history

References

2006 singles
DJ Khaled songs
Pitbull (rapper) songs
Trick Daddy songs
Rick Ross songs
Music videos directed by Gil Green
MNRK Music Group singles
Songs written by Andrew Harr
Songs written by Pitbull (rapper)
Songs written by Trick Daddy
Songs written by Rick Ross
Songs written by Jermaine Jackson (hip hop producer)